Al Rai, which was published as Al Rai Alaam from 1995 to 2006, is a Kuwaiti daily newspaper. According to a 2007 survey by the Washington-based Intermedia group, Al Rai ranked one among Kuwaiti newspapers for the fifth year in a row.

History and profile

The  Al Rai Alaam newspaper license was rented to Jassim Al Boodai (the Alrai owner) in 1995, and it was published as  Al Rai in 2006 after the new press law. Egyptian journalist Abdallah Kamal was the advisor of the paper.

The paper contains numerous interviews with many world leaders. The newspaper is known for generally supporting the Kuwaiti government and ruling family. Its circulation 2001 was 87,000 copies.

In 2004, Al Rai launched a satellite TV, Al Rai TV, which merged with the newspaper to create the Alrai Media Group. The newspaper also launched its online content as a free service. In 2008, Al Rai received the Sheikh Salem Al Ali Al Sabah's award for best designed news website.

The paper's online version  was the eighth most visited website for 2010 in the Middle East and North Africa.

See also
List of newspapers in Kuwait

References

External links
Official website

1961 establishments in Kuwait
Publications established in 1961
Newspapers published in Kuwait
Arabic-language newspapers
Mass media in Kuwait
Weekly newspapers